The Ranger Regiment is a special operations-capable unit of the British Army which was formed on 1 December 2021 under the Future Soldier reform and is part of the Army Special Operations Brigade. It is intended to be used primarily in an unconventional warfare and foreign internal defence capacity in a similar manner to the US Green Berets.

History
On 22 March 2021, the Defence in a Competitive Age paper was released underlining the future of the British Armed Forces.  As part of a wider reorganisation of the British Army, the following was announced:

Initially, the regiment is planned to be "based on four Infantry Battalions but selecting personnel from across the Army".  The regiment's task will be as follows: "[It will be] designed to support and conduct special operations discreetly in high-risk environments". According to a reporter of Forces News, the regiment will "conduct missions traditionally carried out by United Kingdom Special Forces (Special Air Service and Special Boat Service)".  During an interview with the (then) Chief of the Defence Staff, General Sir Nick Carter, the rangers will be "special forces" and will "go beyond training, advising, and assisting" to "support local operations".  He also stated the Ranger's functions will be similar to the United States Army's "Green Berets", a nickname for the US Army Special Forces.

The regiment was initially due to form in August 2021, however this was subsequently postponed to 1 December 2021.  In early 2022 soldiers from the regiment deployed as part of a UK government support package to Ukraine.  In February 2022 soldiers from the regiment deployed to Ghana to conduct training with the Ghanaian Special Operations Brigade, in preparation for a major exercise as well as to help them eliminate threats originating from their border regions.

Regimental organisation
The regiment was formed on 1 December 2021 through the renaming of four of the existing Specialised Infantry battalions. All four battalions were formed on 1 December 2021 and fall under the Army Special Operations Brigade, operationally they are aligned to regions around the globe.  All battalions will restructure by April 2023. 

A gun-metal grey beret and stable belt are worn by the Regiment.

1st Battalion
The 1st Battalion, Ranger Regiment (1 RANGER) was previously the Royal Scots Borderers, 1st Battalion, Royal Regiment of Scotland. The battalion is based at Palace Barracks in Belfast, Northern Ireland. It is regionally aligned to West Africa.

2nd Battalion
The 2nd Battalion, Ranger Regiment (2 RANGER) was previously the 2nd Battalion, Princess of Wales's Royal Regiment (Queen's and Royal Hampshires). The battalion is based at Keogh Barracks, Ash Vale, Surrey. It is regionally aligned to East Africa.

3rd Battalion
The 3rd Battalion, Ranger Regiment (3 RANGER) was previously the 2nd Battalion, Duke of Lancaster's Regiment (King's, Lancashire and Border). The battalion is currently based at Elizabeth Barracks, Pirbright, but will move to Aldershot Garrison in 2027. It is regionally aligned to Europe.

4th Battalion

The 4th Battalion, Ranger Regiment (4 RANGER) was previously the 4th Battalion, The Rifles. The battalion is based at Normandy Barracks, Aldershot Garrison. It is regionally aligned to the Middle East.

Reinforcement companies
The regiment also includes a pair of Gurkha reinforcement companies. These were raised as part of the plan to reform the 3rd Battalion, Royal Gurkha Rifles, which would be the fifth battalion assigned to the Specialised Infantry Group. A (Coriano) Company was formed on 31 January 2020 as the first sub-unit of the new battalion. The formation of the new battalion's second company was planned for 18 November 2021. However, prior to this taking place, the formation of the new battalion was cancelled, with the two companies instead to be used as independent units attached to other battalions of the new Ranger Regiment. Upon the formation of the Rangers, the second formed company, F (Falklands) Company, was attached to 2 RANGER, while the original company, renamed as G (Coriano) Company, was attached to 4 RANGER.

Training and selection
The Ranger battalions are planned to be "all-arms" battalions and thus be open to anyone serving in the Army, providing that they have served for 18 months from completing basic training.

All applicants to the ranger regiment will have to undertake a two-week Cadre Course at the Sennybridge Training Area, followed by a six-week Ranger Course, before continuing with eight months of training at their battalion.

Cap badge controversy

After it was revealed to the public, the cap badge of the Ranger Regiment was the subject of a controversy after some commentators claimed it bore a resemblance to the badge of the Selous Scouts, a special forces unit of the Rhodesian Army which operated during the Rhodesian Bush War. A Daily Telegraph article claimed that several British Army officers who were privy to the discussions over the creation of the Ranger Regiment's beret were concerned that the new cap badge were potentially based on the badge of the Selous Scouts and unsuccessfully attempted to change the design. An anonymous source in the Ministry of Defence told the Daily Telegraph that "An officer said he had seen an email saying that it was actually based on the Selous Scouts... There’s obvious differences but it’s f------ close and clearly based on it." However, the British Army rejected such claims, with an army spokesman stating that "The Ranger Regiment cap badge has been designed around the peregrine falcon. Any comparison or association to the osprey depicted in the Selous Scouts’ cap badge is completely inaccurate. The Ranger Regiment is very proud of its new cap-badge which takes inspiration and spirit from the peregrine falcon; fast, agile and fiercely loyal to its partner, it operates around the world in all environments including deserts, mountains and cities."

References

21st-century military history of the United Kingdom
Future Soldier
British Army
Military units and formations established in 2021
Infantry regiments of the British Army
British Army Rangers